Clive Jacobs is a British businessman and entrepreneur. He is the founder of Holiday Autos Group and Travel Weekly Group.

Career

Holiday Autos Group
In 1988 he co-founded Holiday Autos Group, the first car rental broker in Europe, and one of the first travel companies to offer a pre-bookable pre-paid fully inclusive product that was guaranteed in price. The company also claimed to be the first to offer a late deals car hire website. Backed by ECI Ventures Jacobs bought out his partners in 1995. Jacobs went on to sell Holiday Autos to lastminute.com for £43 million in 2003.

Travel Weekly Group
In 2009, Jacobs founded Travel Weekly Group and acquired Travel Weekly and its associated brands, websites and events from Reed Business Information.

In 2012 he added to the portfolio with the acquisition of The Caterer (formerly Caterer and Hotelkeeper) also from Reed Business Information. In 2016 he launched the umbrella brand Jacobs Media Group. He is chairman and majority owner of the group, which employs around 100 people based in Victoria, London.

Other business interests
In 2008 Jacobs bought the Michelin-starred New Angel Restaurant and Rooms in Dartmouth in Devon, which he went on to sell to Alan Murchison’s 10 in 8 Fine Dining Group in 2010.

In 2012, Jacobs was involved in talks with other investors, including former Thomas Cook Group executive Terry Fisher, about a possible £400 million buyout of Thomas Cook Group.

In 2014, Jacobs took a stake in and became chairman of luxury travel business Tully Luxury Travel (formerly known as The Cruise Professionals).

References

External links 
 Official website

Living people
British chief executives
Year of birth missing (living people)
Place of birth missing (living people)